Yusefabad (also Romanized as Yūsefābād and Yūsofābād) is a village in Pirakuh Rural District, in the Central District of Jowayin County, Razavi Khorasan Province, Iran. At the 2006 census, its population was 185, in 63 families.

References 

Populated places in Joveyn County